Almenar de Soria is a municipality located in the province of Soria, Castile and León, Spain.
 
According to the 2004 census (INE), the municipality had a population of 342 inhabitants.

References

Municipalities in the Province of Soria